Qurimarka (Quechua quri gold, marka village / storey) is an archaeological site in Peru. It is located in the Cusco Region, Urubamba Province, Ollantaytambo District. It is situated at the river Rayanniyuq (Rayanniyoc) and it belongs to the community Rayanniyuq.

See also 
 Kusichaka River
 Pinkuylluna
 Pumamarka
 Willka Wiqi
 Willkaraqay

References 

Archaeological sites in Peru
Archaeological sites in Cusco Region